Vlkava is a municipality and village in Mladá Boleslav District in the Central Bohemian Region of the Czech Republic. It has about 400 inhabitants.

Administrative parts
The village of Bor is an administrative part of Vlkava.

Geography
It lies in the Jizera Table. The Vlkava River flows through the municipality. The village is situated on the shore of the Vlkava Pond.

History
The first written mention of Vlkava is from 1046. A medieval wooden fortress was first documented in 1415. After 1601, the fortress was replaced by a small castle. The most notable owners of Vlkava were the Harrach family. They owned the village from 1636 to 1789 and they had built here a new Baroque castle. However, this castle was burned down in 1873.

Sights
The most valuable building is the Vlkava Castle. It is a small Baroque rural castle from the 17th century. The building is unused and falling into disrepair.

Notable people
Šimon Brixi (1693–1735), composer

References

External links

Villages in Mladá Boleslav District